Jessica Hammer is an assistant professor in the Human-Computer Interaction Institute at Carnegie Mellon University.

Early life and education
Hammer, who was a finalist in the Regeneron Science Talent Search, attended the Maimonides School, in Brookline, Massachusetts.

She is the daughter of Michael Martin Hammer.

She earned her B.A. in computer science at Harvard University, her MS from the NYU Interactive Telecommunications Program and her Ph.D. in cognitive science at Columbia University, where she developed the game design course sequence and was a founding member of the Teachers College EGGPLANT game research laboratory.

Career
Hammer's research focuses on the psychology of games, focusing on the way specific game design decisions affect how players think and feel.

While a graduate student at Columbia, Hammer helped create Lit, a mobile game designed to help individuals quit smoking.  Hammer has worked on video games for the National Institute of Health and for Nokia.

She also spent time in Ethiopia, working with local partners to create game clubs that help girls acquire the social capital and the skills they need to solve their problems for themselves.
In 2014 she was selected as a World Economic Forum Young Scientist.

In his 1998 book, Why We Don 't Talk to Each Other Anymore: The De-Voicing of Society, biolinguist John L. Locke discusses the research produced by Hammer as a young researcher working with Simon Baron-Cohen.  According to Locke, Baron-Cohen and Hammer found that the parents of individuals with Asperger's syndrome did less well than the general population on tasks involving the interpretation of emotional status of others by looking at the expression of their eyes, and better than the general population at identifying shapes embedded within complex designs.

Since 2014, Hammer's recent projects include exploring live action role-playing games as a potential avenue for improving mental or physical health,  and conducting research on how games may reduce opioid abuse after work-related injuries.

Currently, Hammer works as an assistant professor at Carnegie Mellon University, jointly appointed between the HCI Institute and the Entertainment Technology Center. She teaches courses related to Game Design and Learning Media.

Jessica Hammer started the OHLab with Amy Ogan along with their students, staff, and colleagues. The lab works at the intersection of culture, learning, play, and design in order to create brand new interactions and experiences. Through games, educational technologies, and new frameworks of interaction, the lab pushes on the edges of learning, empathy, and social empowerment.

References

External links 
Hammer's personal homepage
Hammer's CMU home page
Hammer's OHLab

American computer scientists
American women computer scientists
Human–computer interaction researchers
Harvard University alumni
Human-Computer Interaction Institute faculty
Living people
Carnegie Mellon University faculty
New York University alumni
Columbia University alumni
Teachers College, Columbia University alumni
Year of birth missing (living people)